Thames Valley is an area of England covering the River Thames west of London.

Thames Valley may refer to:

Canada
 Thames Valley, an area in and around London, Ontario
 Thames Valley, Ontario
 Thames Valley College (London, Ontario)

England
 Thames Valley (European Parliament constituency) (1979–1999)
 Thames Valley Police, a Police Force covering Berkshire, Buckinghamshire and Oxfordshire
 Thames Valley University, former name of University of West London
 ITV Thames Valley, a former ITV region
 M4 corridor, part of which is synonymous with the Thames Valley

New Zealand
 Thames Valley, New Zealand

See also